Mackevič is a Lithuanian-language spelling of the Polish surname Mackiewicz. Another Lithuanization, including Lithuanian surname morphology, is Mackevičius. Notable people with this surname include:

Michal Mackevič (born 1953),  Lithuanian Polish journalist and politician, member of Lithuanian Parliament (Sejmas)
,  Lithuanian Polish biologist and politician, member of Lithuanian Parliament (Sejmas)

Lithuanian-language surnames
Surnames of Polish origin

lt:Mackevič